Howard Morgan may refer to:

 Howard Morgan, American police officer shot 28 times by four Chicago police officers, see Howard Morgan case
 Howard Morgan (weather forecaster), American retired weather forecaster
 Howard Morgan (cricketer) (born 1931), former Welsh cricketer
 Howard J. Morgan (1949–2020), British portrait painter
 Howard L. Morgan (born 1945), American venture capitalist, philanthropist and writer